Hamilton Quarry is a Late Carboniferous lagerstätte near Hamilton, Kansas, United States.  It has a diverse assemblage of unusually well-preserved marine, euryhaline, freshwater, flying, and terrestrial fossils (invertebrates, vertebrates, and plants).  This extraordinary mix of fossils suggests it was once an estuary. This type of Lagerstätte is considered a Konservat-Lagerstätte (or conservation lagerstätte), due to the quality the preservation of soft tissue (skin preservation).

The lagerstätte occurs within a paleovalley that was incised into the surrounding Carboniferous cyclothemic sequence during a time of low sea level and was then filled in during a subsequent transgression. The channel has a capping series of interbedded laminated limestones and mudstones for which are designated the Lagerstätte beds or ‘vertebrate horizon’. This facies contains a well-preserved mixed assemblage of terrestrial (conifers, insects, myriapods, reptiles), freshwater (ostracods), aquatic (amphibians, reptile), brackish or euryhaline (ostracods, eurypterids, microconchids, fish), and marine (brachiopods, echinoderms) fossils.

Paleobiota 
According to thesis

Vertebrates

Arthropods

Mollusks

Other animals

Lycophytes and ferns

Seed ferns

Gymnosperms

Spores and Pollen

Fuslinids

References

External links
Hamilton Quarry is managed by the Johnston Geology Museum at Emporia State University.
The Surficial Geology of the Hamilton Quarry Area, Kansas Geological Survey (KGS) Open-file Report 2005-13.

Carboniferous Kansas
Carboniferous paleontological sites
Geography of Greenwood County, Kansas
Lagerstätten
Paleontology in Kansas
Paleozoic paleontological sites of North America
Emporia State University